Super Albatross can refer to:

Bowlus BS-100 Super Albatross sailplane
Super Albatross (video game), a golf video game released for the PC Engine CD-ROM² System.